Smilin' Through is a 1941 Technicolor MGM musical film based on the 1919 play of the same name by Jane Cowl and Jane Murfin.

The film was a remake of a previous 1932 version by MGM and was the third and final film version of the play. It starred Jeanette MacDonald, Brian Aherne, Gene Raymond, and Ian Hunter. It was filmed in Technicolor and was remade as a musical for MacDonald with several older songs interpolated into the story.

Plot summary

The plot remained essentially the same as in the play and previous film versions. Kathleen (Jeanette MacDonald) is a young Irish woman in love with an American, Kenneth Wayne (Gene Raymond). The romance, however, is opposed by her adopted father John Carteret (Brian Aherne), who recalls the painful memory of his tragically thwarted love for Kathleen's aunt, Moonyean Clare (the roles of Kathleen and Moonyean are both played by MacDonald).

Cast

References

External links

 
 
 
 

1941 films
1940s romantic musical films
American romantic musical films
Films directed by Frank Borzage
American films based on plays
Remakes of American films
Metro-Goldwyn-Mayer films
Films produced by Frank Borzage
Films with screenplays by Donald Ogden Stewart
Films produced by Victor Saville
Films based on works by Jane Cowl
Films based on works by Jane Murfin
1940s English-language films
1940s American films
Films with screenplays by John L. Balderston